Cicero C. Hammock (1823December 15, 1890)  was the 22nd and 24th Mayor of Atlanta, Georgia, during the Reconstruction era.

Biography
Born in Walton County, Hammock served in the United States Army during the Mexican–American War, where he served with another future mayor, Captain Allison Nelson. After the war, he moved to Oglethorpe County, Georgia where he married, but soon after moved to Atlanta.

When the American Civil War began, he entered the Confederate States Army as a commissioned officer.

After the war, he returned to Atlanta and began working as a merchant with the firm Langston, Crane & Hammock and later he worked the real estate trade with a prominent office on Whitehall St at Five Points.

During his first reconstruction-era term as mayor he inaugurated the city's waterworks system and his second term was the first two-year term after Atlanta adopted a new city charter.

He served as president of the city water commission from the mid-1880s until his death.

Notes

Mayors of Atlanta
American military personnel of the Mexican–American War
People of Georgia (U.S. state) in the American Civil War
Confederate States Army officers
1823 births
1890 deaths
19th-century American politicians